Koheysh (also Romanized as Kaheysh, Kahish, and Kahyesh) is a village in Mollasani Rural District, in the Central District of Bavi County, Khuzestan Province, Iran. It had a  population of 72, in 13 families according to the 2006 census.

References 

Populated places in Bavi County